"Nothing in the Dark" is episode 81 of the American television anthology series The Twilight Zone, originally airing on January 5, 1962.
This is one of two episodes that were filmed during season two but held over for broadcast until season three, the other being "The Grave".

Opening narration

Plot
Wanda Dunn, a frail and elderly woman, huddles in a dark basement apartment in an abandoned tenement. She is awakened by an altercation outside, in which Harold Beldon, a young police officer, is shot and falls just outside her door. He cries out that he is dying and pleads for her help, but she is afraid that he is "Mr. Death" trying to trick her into letting him in. She has no phone to call a doctor, but he continues begging her to help him, so she relents. She is relieved when she touches him and doesn't die, which convinces her that he is not Death after all.

Inside she explains her reluctance to help him, describing how she saw Death in the form of a man take an old woman's life just by touching her, and that she has seen him many times since then with different faces. Consequently, she has not left her home in years, preferring to live unhappily than to not live at all.

There is a knock at the door and Harold persuades Wanda to answer it. The man forces the door open and she collapses from terror. When she regains consciousness, the man apologizes and explains he is a building contractor and is tasked to demolish the building in an hour. He tries to persuade her that his work is both necessary and good, since tearing down clears way for the new. He affirms that she has been given due notice, and if she will not leave he will call the police. She turns to Harold for help, but the contractor doesn't see him, and leaves to get the authorities.

It dawns on Wanda that Harold is Death. He explains with a friendly smile that he set up the ruse to gain her trust and convince her that he means her no harm. Wanda continues her protests, but he gently assures her she has nothing to fear and finally persuades her to give him her hand. Before she even realizes anything has changed, she finds herself standing beside her own dead body. Wanda and Harold walk arm in arm through the doorway, up the stairs, outside into the sunlight.

Closing narration

Cast
Gladys Cooper as Wanda Dunn
Robert Redford as Harold Beldon
R. G. Armstrong as Contractor

Reception
IMDb lists this episode at number seven in a ranking of all 156 episodes of The Twilight Zone.

At the 2014 Santa Barbara International Film Festival, Redford stated he has been told by the production company of the series that it is the most often viewed episode of The Twilight Zone.

Sources
DeVoe, Bill. (2008). Trivia from The Twilight Zone. Albany, GA: Bear Manor Media. 
Grams, Martin. (2008). The Twilight Zone: Unlocking the Door to a Television Classic. Churchville, MD: OTR Publishing.

References

External links

Nothing in the Dark review at The Twilight Zone Project

1962 American television episodes
The Twilight Zone (1959 TV series season 3) episodes
Television episodes written by George Clayton Johnson
Television episodes about personifications of death
Television episodes about death